Captain Ohn Kyaw Myint (died July 27, 1977) was a Burmese army officer who was well known for his unsuccessful coup attempt against the Myanmar government led by General Ne Win.

Military career
Ohn Kyaw Myint graduated from Rangoon University. He had completed OTS (Officer Training School) Batch 29 with the best cadet award. He served as a staff officer under General Kyaw Htin, the commander in chief of the Burmese armed forces.

Trial
Ohn Kyaw Myint plotted coup attempt with other young officer and the plot was uncovered by Military Intelligence. He was found guilty at trial and hanged on July 27, 1977. Senior General Than Shwe, Chairman of State Peace and Development Council, who was a junior officer during the time of trial stood as a witness.

References

Burmese military personnel
University of Yangon alumni
1977 deaths
Deaths by hanging